Milltown is a borough in Middlesex County, in the U.S. state of New Jersey. The borough is nestled within the heart of the Raritan Valley region, with Lawrence Brook (a Raritan river tributary) flowing through the center of the community. As of the 2020 United States census, the borough's population was 7,037, an increase of 144 (+2.1%) from the 2010 census count of 6,893, which in turn reflected a decrease of 107 (−1.5%) from the 7,000 counted at the 2000 census.

Milltown was incorporated as a borough by an act of the New Jersey Legislature on January 29, 1889, from portions of North Brunswick, based on the results of a referendum held three days earlier. The borough was reincorporated by resolution of the borough council on May 2, 1896. A portion of East Brunswick Township was annexed in 1902. Originally known as Bergen's Mill, named for Jacob I. Bergen who owned the grist mill, the name is believed to have become "Milltown" from residents "going to the mill in town".

As of the 2000 Census, the center of population for New Jersey was located in Milltown, at Milltown Road, just east of the New Jersey Turnpike (see map of location). Based on the results of the 2010 Census, the center of population had shifted to East Brunswick.

History
Long before the arrival of the first Europeans, the Lenape Native Americans had established settlements along the Lawrence Brook. The discovery of many artifacts in the area above today's municipal building (now a small county park) suggests the presence of a Native American settlement. In 1678, Thomas Lawrence, a New York baker, acquired a large area around the Lawrence Brook, which likely included today's Milltown. The Lawrence Brook was then called Piscopeek (and on later maps, Lawrence's Brook). The names and marks of several Native Americans (Quemareck, Quesiacs, Isarick, Metapis, Peckawan and Turantaca) appear on the bill of sale. In 1769, Fulcard Van Nordstrand advertised the sale of a large gristmill on the bank of Lawrence Brook. It would soon be called Lawrence Brook Mill. The 1903 classic western film The Great Train Robbery was shot in Milltown.

Immediately after the First World War, the 'Illustrated Michelin Guides' to the battlefields of the Western Front were published in Milltown.

In March 2010, the Milltown City Council voted against changing the name of Petain Avenue, citing the difficulties that the street's residents would endure if the name changed. Petain Avenue is named for Philippe Pétain, a French World War I general who became the leader of the Vichy France government during World War II. The Vichy Regime willfully collaborated with Nazi Germany, taking state action against "undesirables", including Jews, Protestants, gays, gypsies, and left-wing activists. In total, the Vichy government participated in the deportation of 76,000 Jews to German extermination camps, although this number varies depending on the account; only 2,500 survived the war.  After the war, Petain was charged with perjury and sentenced to death, though this was commuted to life imprisonment due to his advanced age. By contrast, in France itself, the French government has since changed the name of every street formerly named after Petain.

The groundbreaking anxiolytic and sedative drug Miltown (meprobamate) developed by Carter Products, which became available to the public in the mid-1950s, was named for the borough.

Geography
According to the United States Census Bureau, the borough had a total area of 1.60 square miles (4.13 km2), including 1.55 square miles (4.02 km2) of land and 0.04 square miles (0.11 km2) of water (2.56%).

The borough borders North Brunswick to the west and East Brunswick to the east.

The Lawrence Brook, a tributary of the Raritan River, flows through the borough after exiting the Farrington Lake; a dam, under Main Street, creates a reservoir, the Mill Pond. The brook's watershed covers  that includes Milltown and East Brunswick, New Brunswick, North Brunswick and South Brunswick.

Climate
The climate in the area is characterized by hot, humid summers and generally cold winters.  According to the Köppen Climate Classification system, Milltown has a humid continental climate, abbreviated "Dfa" on climate maps.

Demographics

2010 census

The Census Bureau's 2006–2010 American Community Survey showed that (in 2010 inflation-adjusted dollars) median household income was $89,457 (with a margin of error of +/− $14,398) and the median family income was $103,750 (+/− $7,631). Males had a median income of $63,377 (+/− $5,321) versus $41,029 (+/− $3,358) for females. The per capita income for the borough was $33,472 (+/− $2,034). About 2.9% of families and 3.0% of the population were below the poverty line, including 3.9% of those under age 18 and 5.3% of those age 65 or over.

2000 census
As of the 2000 United States census there were 7,000 people, 2,627 households, and 1,943 families residing in the borough. The population density was 4,452.0 people per square mile (1,721.5/km2). There were 2,670 housing units at an average density of 1,698.1 per square mile (656.6/km2). The racial makeup of the borough was 93.86% White, 0.76% African American, 0.16% Native American, 3.07% Asian, 1.16% from other races, and 1.00% from two or more races. Hispanic or Latino of any race were 3.73% of the population.

There were 2,627 households, out of which 31.7% had children under the age of 18 living with them, 60.9% were married couples living together, 9.9% had a female householder with no husband present, and 26.0% were non-families. 21.4% of all households were made up of individuals, and 9.7% had someone living alone who was 65 years of age or older. The average household size was 2.66 and the average family size was 3.12.

In the borough the population was spread out, with 22.9% under the age of 18, 6.8% from 18 to 24, 29.5% from 25 to 44, 25.1% from 45 to 64, and 15.7% who were 65 years of age or older. The median age was 40 years. For every 100 females, there were 93.2 males. For every 100 females age 18 and over, there were 90.2 males.

The median income for a household in the borough was $68,429, and the median income for a family was $77,869. Males had a median income of $50,338 versus $38,220 for females. The per capita income for the borough was $29,996. About 1.3% of families and 2.3% of the population were below the poverty line, including 3.3% of those under age 18 and 1.3% of those age 65 or over.

Government

Local government
Milltown is governed under the Borough form of New Jersey municipal government, which is used in 218 municipalities (of the 564) statewide, making it the most common form of government in New Jersey. The governing body is comprised of the Mayor and the Borough Council, with all positions elected at-large on a partisan basis as part of the November general election. A Mayor is elected directly by the voters to a four-year term of office. The Borough Council is comprised of six members elected to serve three-year terms on a staggered basis, with two seats coming up for election each year in a three-year cycle. The Borough form of government used by Milltown is a "weak mayor / strong council" government in which council members act as the legislative body with the mayor presiding at meetings and voting only in the event of a tie. The mayor can veto ordinances subject to an override by a two-thirds majority vote of the council. The mayor makes committee and liaison assignments for council members, and most appointments are made by the mayor with the advice and consent of the council.

, the Mayor of Milltown is Democrat Trina Jensen Mehr, whose term of office ends December 31, 2023. Members of the Milltown Borough Council are Council President Felipe "Phil" Zambrana (D, 2022), Anna M. Neubauer (D, 2022), Margaret O'Donnell (D, 2023), James Pareti (D, 2023), David Potter (D, 2024) and Richard Revolinsky (R, 2024).

In January 2020, James Pareti was appointed by the Borough Council to fill the seat expiring in December 2020 that became vacant when Trina Jensen Mehr resigned to take office as mayor earlier that month.

In the November 2011 General Election, Democrat Eric Steeber was elected to a four-year term as mayor, the borough's first Democrat to serve in the position for 25 years, while his running mates Randy Farkas and Joseph Pietanza won three-year terms on the Borough Council.

Federal, state and county representation
Milltown is located in the 12th Congressional District and is part of New Jersey's 17th state legislative district.

 

Middlesex County is governed by a Board of County Commissioners, whose seven members are elected at-large on a partisan basis to serve three-year terms of office on a staggered basis, with either two or three seats coming up for election each year as part of the November general election. At an annual reorganization meeting held in January, the board selects from among its members a commissioner director and deputy director. , Middlesex County's Commissioners (with party affiliation, term-end year, and residence listed in parentheses) are 
Commissioner Director Ronald G. Rios (D, Carteret, term as commissioner ends December 31, 2024; term as commissioner director ends 2022),
Commissioner Deputy Director Shanti Narra (D, North Brunswick, term as commissioner ends 2024; term as deputy director ends 2022),
Claribel A. "Clary" Azcona-Barber (D, New Brunswick, 2022),
Charles Kenny (D, Woodbridge Township, 2022),
Leslie Koppel (D, Monroe Township, 2023),
Chanelle Scott McCullum (D, Piscataway, 2024) and 
Charles E. Tomaro (D, Edison, 2023).
Constitutional officers are
County Clerk Nancy Pinkin (D, 2025, East Brunswick),
Sheriff Mildred S. Scott (D, 2022, Piscataway) and 
Surrogate Claribel Cortes (D, 2026; North Brunswick).

Politics
As of March 2011, there were a total of 5,075 registered voters in Milltown, of which 1,609 (31.7%) were registered as Democrats, 823 (16.2%) were registered as Republicans and 2,643 (52.1%) were registered as Unaffiliated. There were no voters registered to other parties.

In the 2020 presidential election, Republican Donald J. Trump received 50% of the vote (2,135 cast), ahead of Democrat Joseph Biden with 47.8% (2,043 votes), and other candidates with 1.4% (53 votes), among the 4,344 ballots cast by the borough's 5,569 registered voters, for a turnout of 78%. In the 2012 presidential election, Republican Mitt Romney received 49.9% of the vote (1,828 cast), ahead of Democrat Barack Obama with 48.7% (1,784 votes), and other candidates with 1.4% (53 votes), among the 3,706 ballots cast by the borough's 5,159 registered voters (41 ballots were spoiled), for a turnout of 71.8%. In the 2008 presidential election, Republican John McCain received 52.0% of the vote (2,112 cast), ahead of Democrat Barack Obama with 45.5% (1,848 votes) and other candidates with 1.6% (65 votes), among the 4,058 ballots cast by the borough's 5,250 registered voters, for a turnout of 77.3%. In the 2004 presidential election, Republican George W. Bush received 55.5% of the vote (2,181 ballots cast), outpolling Democrat John Kerry with 42.9% (1,683 votes) and other candidates with 0.9% (44 votes), among the 3,927 ballots cast by the borough's 5,064 registered voters, for a turnout percentage of 77.5.

In the 2013 gubernatorial election, Republican Chris Christie received 64.6% of the vote (1,650 cast), ahead of Democrat Barbara Buono with 33.5% (855 votes), and other candidates with 2.0% (51 votes), among the 2,586 ballots cast by the borough's 5,180 registered voters (30 ballots were spoiled), for a turnout of 49.9%. In the 2009 gubernatorial election, Republican Chris Christie received 55.9% of the vote (1,684 ballots cast), ahead of Democrat Jon Corzine with 32.6% (982 votes), Independent Chris Daggett with 8.7% (261 votes) and other candidates with 1.6% (47 votes), among the 3,011 ballots cast by the borough's 5,096 registered voters, yielding a 59.1% turnout.

Education
The Milltown Public Schools serves students in public school for pre-kindergarten through eighth grade. As of the 2020–21 school year, the district, comprised of two schools, had an enrollment of 777 students and 70.2 classroom teachers (on an FTE basis), for a student–teacher ratio of 11.1:1. Schools in the district (with 2020–21 enrollment data from the National Center for Education Statistics) are 
Parkview School with 323 students in grades Pre-K–3 and 
Joyce Kilmer School with 449 students in grades 4–8.

For ninth through twelfth grades, public school students attend Spotswood High School in Spotswood as part of a sending/receiving relationship with the Spotswood Public Schools, which also serves students from Helmetta. In 2013, Milltown and Spotswood had discussions of expanding the partnership between the two districts beyond the sending relationship.  of the 2020–21 school year, the high school had an enrollment of 692 students and 57.0 classroom teachers (on an FTE basis), for a student–teacher ratio of 12.1:1.

The community is also served by the Greater Brunswick Charter School, a K–8 charter school serving students from Milltown, Edison, Highland Park and New Brunswick. As of the 2017–2018 school year, the school had an enrollment of 395 students and 33.0 classroom teachers (on an FTE basis), for a student–teacher ratio of 12.0:1.

Eighth grade students from all of Middlesex County are eligible to apply to attend the high school programs offered by the Middlesex County Vocational and Technical Schools, a county-wide vocational school district that offers full-time career and technical education at Middlesex County Academy in Edison, the Academy for Allied Health and Biomedical Sciences in Woodbridge and at its East Brunswick, Perth Amboy and Piscataway technical high schools, with no tuition charged to students for attendance.

Our Lady of Lourdes School (Pre-K–8) operates under the supervision of Roman Catholic Diocese of Metuchen.

Transportation

Roads and highways

Ryders Lane (County Route 617) is a major artery serving the borough along the eastern border. The New Jersey Turnpike (Interstate 95) passes through for about a mile, but the closest interchange is in neighboring East Brunswick. Also, US 1 is outside in neighboring North Brunswick.

Public transportation
On weekdays, NJ Transit provides local bus service on the 811 route.

Coach USA Suburban Transit provides NYC rush-hour commuter service on the 400 route.

The Raritan River Railroad ran through Milltown, but is now defunct along this part of the line. The track and freight station still remain. Proposals have been made to use the line as a light rail route.

Notable people

People who were born in, residents of, or otherwise closely associated with Milltown include:

 J. Edward Crabiel (1916–1992), politician who served in the New Jersey Senate and as New Jersey Secretary of State, until forced to resign
 Josephine Figlo (1923–2011), All-American Girls Professional Baseball League outfielder who played for the Milwaukee Chicks and Racine Belles in 1944
 Al Hermann (1899–1980), Major League Baseball infielder who played for the Boston Braves
 David Kikoski (born 1961), jazz pianist
 Leroy Lins (1913–1986), professional basketball player who played for the Akron Goodyear Wingfoots in the National Basketball League
 Danny Pintauro (born 1976), actor who got started as a child actor on the television soap opera As the World Turns, and in the movie Cujo, and came to prominence on the television series Who's the Boss?
 Peter Plantec (born 1943), writer, digital artist and software designer
 David Schwendeman (1924–2012), last full-time chief taxidermist of the American Museum of Natural History from 1959 to 1988, who was a lifelong resident of Milltown
 Geno Zimmerlink (born 1963), former American football tight end who played for the Atlanta Falcons of the National Football League

References

External links

 Borough of Milltown website
 Milltown Public Schools
 
 School Data for the Milltown Public Schools, National Center for Education Statistics

 
1889 establishments in New Jersey
Borough form of New Jersey government
Boroughs in Middlesex County, New Jersey
Populated places established in 1889